Dyce railway station is a railway station serving the suburb of Dyce, Aberdeen, Scotland. The station is managed by ScotRail and is on the Aberdeen to Inverness Line, with some trains operating on the Edinburgh to Aberdeen Line and Glasgow to Aberdeen Line also extended to call at Dyce and Inverurie. It is sited  from Aberdeen, being the first stop north of the station.

History
The station here was opened (along with the line) in 1854 by the Great North of Scotland Railway. It later became a junction for the Formartine and Buchan Railway, which diverged here and headed north to Peterhead and Fraserburgh; this opened to traffic in 1861 and had its own platforms alongside the main line ones.  Passenger services over both branches ended as a result of the Beeching Axe on 4 October 1965 but the station remained open until 6 May 1968. Freight continued to Peterhead until 1970 and to Fraserburgh until October 1979.  There is still evidence on the ground of the old branch platforms which sat on the site of the station car park. The former branch lines are now a long distance cycle path, accessible from the western end of the car park.

The station was reopened by British Rail on 15 September 1984.

Signalling 

Dyce signal box, which opened in 1880, was a tall structure located at the south (Aberdeen) end of the station, on the east side of the railway. In 1928, the box was provided with a new frame of 46 levers, subsequently reduced in size to 26 levers.

Dyce lost its semaphore signals in October 2007 when new colour light signals were brought into use. The lever frame was removed from the signal box (renamed from "Dyce Junction" to "Dyce") and a new relay interlocking and 'NX' (entrance-exit) panel was installed, initially housed inside a temporary signal box.

The signal box was demolished in August 2019 as part of upgrades to the Inverness to Aberdeen line that saw the track between Inverurie and Aberdeen be doubled. The box had been offered for sale but due to its close proximity to a working line, no use could be found for it and nobody wanted to remove the box to another location.

Raiths Farm 

A new freight terminal, named "Raiths Farm", has been built to the north of Dyce station, in a field on the west side of the railway. Construction of the terminal was completed in November 2007.

The Raiths Farm layout comprises arrival and departure lines to the north and south, a run-round loop and four sidings. The facility began operations in 2009.

Location 
Although Dyce station is located next to the runway of Aberdeen Airport, and aircraft can be seen landing and taking off from the station platform, there is no direct link between Dyce station and the airport, as the passenger terminal is the other side of the runway.

Facilities

The station has two platforms connected by a new fully accessible footbridge, implemented in 2014. The station is unstaffed and there is no ticket office, but automatic ticket vending machines are provided. Other facilities include car park, taxi rank, cycle storage, seating and a simple shelter on each platform. Automated announcements, customer help points, timetable posters and train information displays offer running information. Both platforms are fully accessible for disabled passengers, with lifts in the footbridge and level access from the main car park to platform 2.

Passenger volume
Dyce is a popular station with airport passengers, business travellers and commuters, both to and from Aberdeen.

The statistics cover twelve month periods that start in April.

Services
There is a half hourly service in each direction Mondays to Saturdays to Aberdeen and Inverurie, with eleven of the latter trains continuing to Inverness. There are nine southbound and eleven northbound departures on Sundays, five of the latter running to Inverness.

2018 Service improvements
Service frequencies were improved here from 2018 as part of a timetable recast funded by Transport Scotland. The Aberdeen to Inverurie frequency was upped to every 30 minutes, with several of the existing Inverness trains combined with Aberdeen to Glasgow & Edinburgh express services to maintain through journey opportunities. A £170 million project to upgrade the Aberdeen to Inverness line also saw the track through here redoubled by 2019.

The first stage of this work began in May 2018, with trains from the north terminating here and a rail-replacement bus service in operation to/from Aberdeen to allow the required track and signalling improvements to be carried out. The line was closed from 12 May until 19 August 2018. The line was duly redoubled between Aberdeen and Inverurie by the end of 2019.

Connections 
Until May 2017 Stagecoach Bluebird's operated a 80 Jet Connect bus shuttle service between Dyce station and Aberdeen Airport, but this service was discontinued due to low passenger numbers. In 2019, First Aberdeen launched its X27 service which connects the railway station to the airport, heliports, and the P&J Live.

A more frequent bus connection to Dyce airport, the 727, runs from Aberdeen railway station, the next stop south of Dyce.

References

External links

 Railscot - Dyce

Railway stations in Aberdeen
Airport railway stations in the United Kingdom
Railway stations served by ScotRail
Railway stations in Great Britain opened in 1854
Railway stations in Great Britain closed in 1965
Railway stations in Great Britain opened in 1984
Reopened railway stations in Great Britain
Beeching closures in Scotland
Former Great North of Scotland Railway stations
1854 establishments in Scotland